Christos Karadais (born 26 January 1999) is a Greek professional footballer who plays as a goalkeeper for Cypriot First Division club Ermis Aradippou.

References

1999 births
Living people
Greek footballers
Greek expatriate footballers
Cypriot Second Division players
ASIL Lysi players
Association football goalkeepers
Olympiakos Nicosia players
Footballers from Drama, Greece